Tommy Atkins in the Park is an 1898 British short black-and-white silent comedy film, directed by Robert W. Paul, featuring a couple courting in a park who are forced to use desperate measures to get rid of a stout matron who interrupts them. The film was a remake of Alfred Moul's The Soldier's Courtship (1896). It is included on the BFI DVD R.W. Paul: The Collected Films 1895-1908 and a clip is featured in Paul Merton's interactive guide to early British silent comedy How They Laughed on the BFI website.

References

External links

British black-and-white films
British silent short films
British comedy short films
1898 comedy films
1898 films
1898 short films
1890s British films
Films directed by Robert W. Paul
Silent comedy films
Films set in parks